State Road 645 (SR 645) is a state road in the southern section of the U.S. state of Indiana. SR 645 was originally introduced as small part of a much longer SR 58 in 1931. During the early 1940s SR 58 and SR 45 were rerouted around Crane Naval Ammunition Depot. SR 645 was commissioned in the early 1950s.

Route description
SR 645 begins at an intersection with US 231 and runs towards the east. The road passes through woodland with some farmland on its way towards the unincorporated census-designated place of Burns City. In Burns City the road passes houses as the main road. The highway leaves Burns City and quickly meets an entrance to the Naval Surface Warfare Center Crane Division. The SR 645 designation ends at the entrance to the Naval Surface Warfare Center and the roadway continues northeasterly through the Naval Surface Warfare Center.  The traffic count on SR 645 is 1,624 vehicles travel the highway on average each day in 2016.

History
In 1931, the Indiana State Highway Commission added SR 58 between Elnora and Burns City, running along the modern route of SR 645. The state highway commission rerouted SR 58 and SR 45 around Crane Naval Ammunition Depot started in 1941 and finished in 1943. This reroute removed a state road designation from the modern SR 645 routing.  The SR 645 designation was added to its modern routing between 1952 and 1953.

Major intersections

References

External links

645
Transportation in Daviess County, Indiana
Transportation in Martin County, Indiana